Alonso Mariscal Abascal (25 January 1914 – 31 January 1959) was a Mexican diver. He competed in the men's 3 metre springboard event at the 1932 Summer Olympics. He is the brother of Olympic divers Antonio Mariscal, Federico Mariscal, and Diego Mariscal.

Notes

References

External links
 

1914 births
1959 deaths
Mexican male divers
Olympic divers of Mexico
Divers at the 1932 Summer Olympics
Divers from Mexico City